Henry Champion may refer to:
 Henry Champion (general) (1751–1836), American general
 Henry Hyde Champion (1859–1928), social reformer and journalist

See also
 Harry Champion (1866–1942), stage name of the music hall performer
 Harry George Champion (1891–1979), forest officer in British India